Quince cheese (also known as quince paste) is a sweet, thick jelly made of the pulp of the quince fruit. It is a common confection in several countries.

Traditionally from Mediterranean. In Iberian Peninsula, it is called ate or dulce de membrillo in Spanish, marmelada in Portuguese, marmelo in Galician  and codonyat in Catalan, where it is a firm, sticky, sweet reddish hard paste made of the quince (Cydonia oblonga) fruit. It is also very popular in Hungary (as birsalmasajt), Brazil (as marmelada), France (as pâte de coing in French and codonhat in Occitan), Mexico, Argentina, Uruguay, Paraguay and Chile (as dulce de membrillo), Italy (as cotognata), Croatia (as "Kotonjata"), Serbia (as kitnikez), Peru (as machacado de membrillo), Israel (as ממבריו ), Turkey (as ayva peltesi) and Romania (as marmeladă de gutui).

History
The recipe is probably of ancient origin; the Roman cookbook of Apicius, a collection of Roman cookery recipes compiled in the late 4th or early 5th century AD, gives recipes for stewing quince with honey.

Historically, marmalade was made from quince. The English word "marmalade" comes from the Portuguese word marmelada, meaning "quince preparation" (and used to describe quince cheese or quince jam; "marmelo" = "quince"). Nowadays (in English), "A marmalade is a jellied fruit product which holds suspended within it all or part of the fruit pulp and the sliced peel. It is prepared from pulpy fruits, preferably those that contain pectin. Citrus fruits are especially desirable because of their flavor and pectin content."

Preparation
Quince cheese is prepared with quince fruits. The fruit is peeled and cored, and cooked with a teaspoon of water and from 500 to 1000 g sugar per kg of quince pulp, preferably in a pressure cooker, but it can also be left for longer (40 minutes–1 hour) in a regular pot, in this case with a little more water (which will then evaporate). It turns a light brick colour in the pressure cooker and on a regular pot, after a long cooking time, dark brick colour. After leaving it to set for a few days on earthenware/clay bowls (preferable), topped with parchment paper rounds, it becomes a relatively firm quince paste/cheese, dense enough to hold its shape. The taste is sweet but slightly astringent (depending on the amount of sugar used), and it is similar in consistency, flavor and use to guava cheese or guava paste.

Quince jelly is made with the skins and core, including pips, that were discarded when preparing quince cheese. They are cooked until halved in volume and the water is then sieved. For every 1000 ml water, 500 g sugar is added and the concoction is again boiled, until thread point is achieved.

Quince cheese is sold in squares or blocks, then cut into thin slices and spread over toasted bread or sandwiches, plain or with cheese, often served for breakfast or as a snack, with manchego, mató, or Picón cheese (Spain) or Queijo da Serra da Estrela, Serra da Estrela cheese de Azeitão Queijo de Azeit%C3%A3o or São Jorge S%C3%A3o Jorge cheese cheeses (Portugal). It is also often used to stuff pastries.

Regional variations

In Spain, Uruguay, Argentina, Mexico, Chile and Ecuador the quince (Spanish membrillo) is cooked into a reddish gelatin-like block or firm reddish paste known as dulce de membrillo. In Argentina, Brazil and Uruguay similar preparations are made by replacing quince by other ingredients, like sweet potatoes, squashes, apricots, figs or guavas.

The pastafrola, a sweet tart common in Argentina, Uruguay and Paraguay, is usually filled with quince paste. In Argentina and Uruguay, a slice of quince cheese (dulce de membrillo) eaten with a slice of soft cheese is considered the national dessert. In Argentina it is referred to as vigilante. In Uruguay it is known as Martín Fierro in reference to the folk character from the epic poem Martín Fierro by Argentinian author José Hernández.  In Brazil, a similar confection is made with guava paste (Goiabada) and Minas cheese. 

In French "quince paste" or pâte de coing is part of the Provence Christmas traditions and part of the thirteen desserts, which are the traditional dessert foods used in celebrating Christmas in the French region of Provence.

In Serbia, especially Vojvodina, all of Hungary, and continental Croatia, i.e., Slavonija quince cheese is an often prepared sweet and is named kitn(i)kes, derived from German "Quittenkäse".

Quince cheese, a New England specialty of the 18th century, required all-day boiling to achieve a solidified state, similar to the French cotignac.

In Hungary, quince cheese is called birsalmasajt, and is prepared with small amounts of lemon zest, cinnamon or cloves and often with peeled walnut inside. Péter Melius Juhász, the Hungarian botanist, mentioned quince cheese as early as 1578 as a fruit preparation with medical benefits.

In Vojvodina, it is sometimes prepared with addition of finely grated walnut, hazelnut or pumpkin seeds. Sometimes a certain amount of sugar would be replaced by an equal amount of linden honey.

See also

 List of spreads
Thirteen desserts
 Lekvar
 Goiabada
 Bocadillo

References

Desserts
Portuguese desserts
Food combinations
French desserts
Hungarian desserts
Italian desserts
Serbian cuisine
Spanish desserts
New Mexican cuisine
Chilean cuisine
Argentine cuisine
Uruguayan cuisine
Croatian desserts
Confectionery
Jams and jellies
New England cuisine
Vegan cuisine
Christmas food
Christmas in France